S.S. Lazio Youth Sector comprises the under-19 team and the academies of Italian professional football club S.S. Lazio.

Lazio Primavera
The under-19 squad usually competes in the Campionato Primavera 1 but currently plays in the Campionato Primavera 2 after being relegated in the 2020-21 campaign.

The club's Primavera side have been champions of Italy five times, having last won the championship back in 2012–13 after beating Atalanta 3-0 in the final. They have also won the Coppa Italia Primavera on three occasions (1978-79, 2013-14, 2014-15) and the Supercoppa Primavera on one occasion (2014-15).  

Alessandro Calori has been in charge of Lazio Primavera since June 11, 2021. He replaced Leonardo Menichini who managed the team for 55 matches (17W-10D-28L).

Current squad

Non-playing staff (under-19 squad)
 Team Managers: Cormac McAinsh / Salvatore Schietroma / Maurizio Spreghini  
 Head Coach: Alessandro Calori
 Assistant Coach: Vinicio Edwards Espinal Marte
 Fitness Coach: Luca Errante Parrino
 Goalkeeping Coach: Francesco Cioffarelli
 Team Doctors: Fabio Quintarelli / Gabriele Antonini 
 Physiotherapists: Ferdinando Margutti / Massimo Romano Papola

Lazio U17
The under-17 squad currently competes in the Allievi Nazionali U17 - Serie A/B - Girone C.

Non-playing staff (under-17 squad)
Team Managers: Andrea Torda / Luigi De Sanctis
 Head Coach: Salvatore D'Ursa
 Fitness Coach: Mario Genova

Notable former Primavera and youth team players
Many players from Lazio's Primavera squad go on to have careers in professional football, whether at Lazio or at other clubs. The following is a list of players who have represented their country at full international level and/or have played regularly at a high level of club football.

 Alessandro Nesta
 Marco Di Vaio
 Alessandro Tuia
 Antonio Rozzi
 Danilo Cataldi
 Alessandro Murgia
 Luca Crecco
 Cristiano Lombardi
 Simone Palombi
 Luca Germoni
 Alessandro Rossi (footballer)
 Michael Folorunsho
 Manolo Portanova
 Chris Ikonomidis
 Josip Elez
 Keita Baldé
 Mamadou Tounkara
 Franjo Prce
 Thomas Strakosha

See also 

 S.S. Lazio
 Lazio Women
 Lazio (Futsal)

References

External links
 Official website 

S.S. Lazio
Football academies in Italy
Football clubs in Rome